Man'ha Garreau-Dombasle, born Germaine Massenet (June 11, 1898 – August 4, 1999) was a writer, poet, and translator. Among others, she translated her friend Ray Bradbury's 1953 novel Fahrenheit 451 into French. He later dedicated his 1972 novel, The Halloween Tree, to her: "With love for Madame Man'ha Garreau-Dombasle met twenty-seven years ago in the graveyard at midnight on the Island of Janitzio at Lake Pátzcuaro, Mexico, and remembered on each anniversary of the Day of the Dead."

Born in Calais, June 11, 1898, Garreau-Dombasle was the grandmother of French-American singer, actress and director Arielle Dombasle. Garreau-Dombasle died in Deauville, August 4, 1999.

References 

1898 births
1999 deaths
20th-century American writers
20th-century French writers
20th-century American women writers
20th-century French women writers
French translators
American centenarians
French emigrants to the United States
20th-century American translators
Women centenarians